{{DISPLAYTITLE:δ13C}}

In geochemistry, paleoclimatology, and paleoceanography δ13C (pronounced "delta c thirteen") is an isotopic signature, a measure of the ratio of the two stable isotopes of carbon—13C and 12C—reported in parts per thousand (per mil, ‰). The measure is also widely used in archaeology for the reconstruction of past diets, particularly to see if marine foods or certain types of plants were consumed.

The definition is, in per mille:

where the standard is an established reference material.

δ13C varies in time as a function of productivity, the signature of the inorganic source, organic carbon burial, and vegetation type. Biological processes preferentially take up the lower mass isotope through kinetic fractionation. However some abiotic processes do the same. For example, methane from hydrothermal vents can be depleted by up to 50%.

Reference standard
The standard established for carbon-13 work was the Pee Dee Belemnite (PDB) and was based on a Cretaceous marine fossil, Belemnitella americana, which was from the Peedee Formation in South Carolina. This material had an anomalously high 13C:12C ratio (0.0112372), and was established as δ13C value of zero. Since the original PDB specimen is no longer available, its 13C:12C ratio can be back-calculated from a widely measured carbonate standard NBS-19, which has a δ13C value of +1.95‰. Note that this value differs from the widely used PDB 13C:12C ratio of 0.0112372 used by in isotope forensics and environmental scientists; this discrepancy was previously attributed by a wikipedia author to a sign error in the interconversion between standards, but no citation was provided. Use of the PDB standard gives most natural material a negative δ13C. The standards are used for verifying the accuracy of mass spectroscopy; as isotope studies became more common, the demand for the standard exhausted the supply. Other standards calibrated to the same ratio, including one known as VPDB (for "Vienna PDB"), have replaced the original.
The 13C:12C ratio for VPDB, which the International Atomic Energy Agency (IAEA) defines as δ13C value of zero is 0.01123720.

Causes of δ13C variations
Methane has a very light δ13C signature: biogenic methane of −60‰, thermogenic methane −40‰. The release of large amounts of methane clathrate can impact on global δ13C values, as at the Paleocene–Eocene Thermal Maximum.

More commonly, the ratio is affected by variations in primary productivity and organic burial.  Organisms preferentially take up light 12C, and have a δ13C signature of about −25‰, depending on their metabolic pathway.  Therefore, an increase in δ13C in marine fossils is indicative of an increase in the abundance of vegetation.

An increase in primary productivity causes a corresponding rise in δ13C values as more 12C is locked up in plants.  This signal is also a function of the amount of carbon burial; when organic carbon is buried, more 12C is locked out of the system in sediments than the background ratio.

Geologic significance of δ13C excursions 

C3 and C4 plants have different signatures, allowing the abundance of C4 grasses to be detected through time in the δ13C record. Whereas  plants have a δ13C of −16 to −10‰,  plants have a δ13C of −33 to −24‰.

Mass extinctions are often marked by a negative δ13C anomaly thought to represent a decrease in primary productivity and release of plant-based carbon. Conversely, positive δ13C excursions are interpreted as the result of increased carbon fixation by primary producers and the subsequent burial of this organic carbon in sedimentary rocks, signifying the proliferation of life.

The evolution of large land plants in the late Devonian led to increased organic carbon burial and consequently a rise in δ13C.

Major excursion events
Lomagundi-Jatuli event (2,300–2,080 Ma) Paleoproterozoic - Positive excursion

Shunga-Francevillian event (2,080 Ma) Paleoproterozoic - Negative excursion

Shuram-Wonoka excursion (570–551 Ma) Neoproterozoic - Negative excursion

Steptoean positive carbon isotope excursion (494.6-492 Ma) Paleozoic - Positive excursion

Cenomanian-Turonian boundary event (93.9 Ma) Mesozoic - Positive excursion

Paleocene–Eocene Thermal Maximum (55.5 Ma) Cenozoic - Negative excursion

See also
 
 
 
 Isotopic signature
 Isotope analysis
 Isotope geochemistry
 Isotopic labeling

References

Further reading
 
 Mook, W. G., & Tan, F. C. (1991). Stable carbon isotopes in rivers and estuaries. Biogeochemistry of major world rivers, 42, 245–264.

Bioindicators
Carbon
Isotopes of carbon
Environmental isotopes
Geochemistry
Paleoclimatology